Walter Pichler may refer to:
 Walter Pichler (biathlete)
 Walter Pichler (artist)